Kai Nielsen is the name of:

 Kai Nielsen (footballer)
 Kaj Nielsen (footballer)
 Kai Nielsen (sculptor) (1882–1924), Danish sculptor
 Kai Nielsen (philosopher) (1926–2021), American, Canada-based professor of philosophy
 Sixten Kai Nielsen (born 1978), Danish artist
 Kai Ewans, born Kai Nielsen, Danish jazz musician

See also
 Kay Nielsen (1886–1957), Danish illustrator, pronounced Kai